Kněževes may refer to places in the Czech Republic:

Kněževes (Blansko District), a municipality and village in the South Moravian Region
Kněževes (Rakovník District), a market town in the Central Bohemian Region
Kněževes (Prague-West District), a municipality and village in the Central Bohemian Region
Kněževes (Žďár nad Sázavou District), a municipality and village in the Vysočina Region